Pervushino is a rural locality (a selo) in Starokamyshlinsky Selsoviet, Kushnarenkovsky District, Bashkortostan, Russia. The population was 440 as of 2010. There are 17 streets.

Geography 
Pervushino is located 38 km southeast of Kushnarenkovo (the district's administrative centre) by road. Petropavlovo is the nearest rural locality.

References 

Rural localities in Kushnarenkovsky District